Rachid El Basir born October 4, 1968) is a Moroccan middle distance runner who won the silver medal at the 1992 Summer Olympics over 1500 metres. This achievement came as a great surprise as an El Basir had not qualified for the final at the World Championships the previous year and was generally considered as an outsider. The final in Barcelona was run at an extremely slow pace, which helped El Basir as he could make good use of his natural speed on the last 200m.

External links
 Sports Reference

1968 births
Living people
Moroccan male middle-distance runners
Athletes (track and field) at the 1992 Summer Olympics
Athletes (track and field) at the 1996 Summer Olympics
Olympic athletes of Morocco
Olympic silver medalists for Morocco
Medalists at the 1992 Summer Olympics
Olympic silver medalists in athletics (track and field)
Mediterranean Games silver medalists for Morocco
Mediterranean Games medalists in athletics
Athletes (track and field) at the 1991 Mediterranean Games